Apodanthera herrerae, known as ckoto-ckoto, is grown for its edible tuber. It originates in the Andes.

References

Edible plants
Cucurbitoideae
Flora of Peru